XHENG-FM is a radio station on 97.5 FM in Huauchinango, Puebla, Mexico.

History
XENG-AM 1240 received its concession on December 13, 1960. The 1,000-watt station was owned by Natividad Rodríguez G. de Torres. Radio Nueva Generación, S.A. acquired the concession in 1991, and it moved to 870 in the 1990s.

Until 2015, XHENG carried the grupera format from Grupo Siete and was consequently known as La Jefa and La Única. It did not stay with the format when it renamed to Bengala and kept the La Única name.

XENG was cleared to move to FM in 2011.

References

Radio stations in Puebla